The Beach Abort was an unmanned test in NASA's Project Mercury, of the Mercury spacecraft Launch Escape System. Objectives of the test were a performance evaluation of the escape system, the parachute and landing system, and recovery operations in an off-the-pad abort situation. The test took place at NASA's Wallops Island, Virginia, test facility on May 9, 1960. In the test, the Mercury spacecraft and its Launch Escape System were fired from ground level. The flight lasted a total of 1 minute, 16 seconds. A Marine Corps helicopter recovered the spacecraft 17 minutes after launch. The test was considered a success, although there was insufficient separation distance when the tower jettisoned. Mercury Spacecraft #1, the first spacecraft off McDonnell's production line, was used in this test.

Mercury Spacecraft #1 is displayed at the New York Hall of Science, Corona Park, NY. It is displayed indoors, suspended from the ceiling, with an escape tower of unknown provenance attached.

See also
 Boilerplate (spaceflight)

References

External links
This New Ocean: A History of Project Mercury - NASA SP-4201
Video of Mercury Beach Abort Test
Additional Images of the Spacecraft

Project Mercury
1960 in the United States
Test spaceflights
New York Hall of Science